Pepi I Meryre (also Pepy I) was an ancient Egyptian pharaoh, third king of the Sixth Dynasty of Egypt, who ruled for over 40 years at the turn of the 24th and 23rd centuries BC, toward the end of the Old Kingdom period. He was the son of Teti, the founder of the dynasty, and ascended the throne only after the brief intervening reign of the shadowy Userkare. His mother was Iput, who may have been a daughter of Unas, the final ruler of the preceding Fifth Dynasty. Pepi I, who had at least six consorts, was succeeded by his son Merenre Nemtyemsaf I, with whom he may have shared power in a coregency at the very end of his reign. Pepi II Neferkare, who might also have been Pepi I's son, succeeded Merenre.

Several difficulties accumulated during Pepi's reign, beginning with the possible murder of his father and the ensuing reign of Userkare. Later, probably after his twentieth year of reign, Pepi faced a harem conspiracy hatched by one of his consorts who may have tried to have her son designated heir to the throne, and possibly another conspiracy involving his vizier at the end of his reign. Confronted with the protracted decline of pharaonic power and the emergence of dynasties of local officials, Pepi reacted with a vast architectural program involving the construction of temples dedicated to local gods and numerous chapels for his own cult throughout Egypt, reinforcing his presence in the provinces. Egypt's prosperity allowed Pepi to become the most prolific builder of the Old Kingdom. At the same time, Pepi favored the rise of small provincial centres and recruited officials of non-noble extraction to curtail the influence of powerful local families. Continuing Teti's policy, Pepi expanded a network of warehouses accessible to royal envoys and from which taxes and labor could easily be collected. Finally, he buttressed his power after the harem conspiracy by forming alliances with Khui, the provincial nomarch of Abydos, marrying two of his daughters, Ankhesenpepi I and Ankhesenpepi II, and making both Khui's wife Nebet and her son Djau viziers. The Egyptian state's external policy under Pepi comprised military campaigns against Nubia, Sinai and the southern Levant, landing troops on the Levantine coast using Egyptian transport boats. Trade with Byblos, Ebla and the oases of the Western Desert flourished, while Pepi launched mining and quarrying expeditions to Sinai and further afield.

Pepi had a pyramid complex built for his funerary cult in Saqqara, next to which he built at least a further six pyramids for his consorts. The most extensive corpus of Pyramid Texts from the Old Kingdom cover the walls of Pepi I's burial chamber, antechamber and much of the corridor leading to it. For the first time, these texts also appear in some of the consorts' pyramids. Excavations revealed a bundle of viscera and a mummy fragment, both presumed to belong to the pharaoh. Pepi's complex, called Pepi Mennefer, remained the focus of his funerary cult well into the Middle Kingdom and ultimately gave its name to the nearby capital of Egypt, Memphis. Pepi's cult stopped early in the Second Intermediate Period. Pepi's monuments began to be quarried for their stone in the  New Kingdom, and in the Mamluk era they were almost entirely dismantled.

Family

Parents
Pepi was the son of the pharaoh Teti and Iput. Her parentage is directly attested to by a relief on a decree uncovered in Coptos that mentions Iput as Pepi's mother, by inscriptions in her mortuary temple mentioning her titles as mother of a king and as mother of Pepi, by the architecture of her tomb which had been changed from an original mastaba form into a pyramid on the accession of her son to the throne,
and by her mention as being Pepi's mother on the Sixth Dynasty royal annals. Iput may have been a daughter of Unas, the last pharaoh of the Fifth Dynasty, although this remains uncertain and debated. She seems to have died before Pepi's accession to the throne. The observation that Teti was most probably Pepi's father follows from the location of Iput's tomb, next to Teti's pyramid as was customary for a queen consort.

Consorts

Egyptologists have identified six consorts of Pepi I with near certainty.
Pepi's best-attested consorts were Ankhesenpepi I and Ankhesenpepi II, who both bore future pharaohs and were daughters of the nomarch of Abydos Khui and his wife Nebet. Further consorts are Nubwenet, Inenek-Inti, who became one of Pepi's viziers, and Mehaa (also called Haaheru). All were buried in pyramids adjacent to that of Pepi. Relief fragments from the necropolis surrounding Pepi's pyramid mention another consort, Sebwetet.

Two more consorts have been proposed for Pepi I based on partial evidence. The first is Nedjeftet, whose name is recorded on blocks excavated in the necropolis adjacent to Pepi's pyramid. The identification of Nedjeftet as Pepi's consort remains uncertain owing to the lack of inscriptions explicitly naming her husband. Given the location of Nedjeftet's blocks in the necropolis, she may be the owner of a pyramid west of Pepi's. The second is another consort, named Behenu, who was buried in the second largest queen pyramid of Pepi's necropolis, north of his. She could either be one of his consorts or a consort of Pepi II.

A final unnamed consort, only referred to by her title "Weret-Yamtes" meaning "great of affection", is known from inscriptions uncovered in the tomb of Weni, an official serving Pepi. This consort, whose name is purposefully left unmentioned by Weni, conspired against Pepi and was prosecuted when the conspiracy was discovered.

Children
Pepi fathered at least four sons. Ankhesenpepi I probably bore him the future pharaoh Merenre Nemtyemsaf I. Ankhesenpepi II was the mother of Pepi II Neferkare, who was probably born at the very end of Pepi I's reign given he was only six upon ascending the throne after Merenre's rule. While a majority of Egyptologists favor this hypothesis, an alternative one holds that Pepi II could be a son of Merenre.
Another of Pepi I's sons was Teti-ankh, meaning "Teti lives", whose mother has yet to be identified. Teti-ankh is known only from an ink inscription bearing his name discovered in Pepi's pyramid. Buried nearby is Prince Hornetjerkhet, a son of Pepi with Mehaa.

At least three of Pepi I's daughters have been tentatively identified, all future consorts of Pepi II. The first, Meritites IV, was the king's eldest daughter and was buried in the necropolis surrounding her father's pyramid. The second is Neith, whom he fathered with Ankhesenpepi I. She may have been the mother of Pepi II's successor Merenre Nemtyemsaf II. The third is Iput II, whose identity as Pepi's daughter remains uncertain because her title of "daughter of the king" may only be honorary.

Chronology

Relative chronology 

The relative chronology of Pepi I's reign is well established by historical records, contemporary artifacts and archeological evidence, which agree he succeeded Userkare and was succeeded by Merenre I Nemtyemsaf. For example, the near-contemporary South Saqqara Stone, a royal annal inscribed during the reign of Pepi II, gives the succession "Teti → Userkare → Pepi I → Merenre I", making Pepi the third king of the Sixth Dynasty. Two more historical sources agree with this chronology: the Abydos king list, written under Seti I which places Pepi I's cartouche as the 36th entry between those of Userkare and Merenre, and the Turin canon, a list of kings on papyrus dating to the reign of Ramses II which records Pepi I in the fourth column, third row.

Historical sources against this order of succession include the Aegyptiaca, a history of Egypt written in the 3rd century BC during the reign of Ptolemy II (283 – 246 BC) by Manetho. No copies of the Aegyptiaca have survived, and it is now known only through later writings by Sextus Julius Africanus and Eusebius. According to the Byzantine scholar George Syncellus, Africanus wrote that the Aegyptiaca mentioned the succession "Othoês → Phius → Methusuphis" at the start of the Sixth Dynasty. Othoês, Phius (in Greek, φιός), and Methusuphis are understood to be the Hellenized forms for Teti, Pepi I and Merenre, respectively, meaning that the Aegyptiaca omits Userkare. Manetho's reconstruction of the early Sixth Dynasty agrees with the Karnak king list written under Thutmosis III. This list places Pepi's birth name immediately after that of Teti in the seventh entry of the second row. Unlike other sources such as the Turin canon, the purpose of the Karnak king list was not to be exhaustive, but rather to list a selection of royal ancestors to be honoured. Similarly the Saqqara Tablet, written under Ramses II, omits Userkare, with Pepi's name given as the 25th entry after that of Teti.

Length of reign

The length of Pepi I's reign remains somewhat uncertain, although as of 2021, the consensus is that he ruled over Egypt for over 40 years, possibly 49 or 50 years and possibly longer.

During the Old Kingdom period, the Egyptians counted years from the beginning of the reign of the current king. These years were referred to by the number of cattle counts which had taken place since the reign's start. The cattle count was an important event aimed at evaluating the amount of taxes to be levied on the population. This involved counting cattle, oxen and small livestock. During the early Sixth Dynasty, this count was probably biennial, occurring every two years.

The South Saqqara Stone and an inscription in Hatnub both record the 25th cattle count under Pepi I, his highest known date. Accepting a biennial count, this indicates that Pepi reigned for 49 years. That a 50th year of reign could have also been recorded on the royal annal cannot be discounted, however, because of the damaged state of the South Saqqara Stone. Another historical source supporting such a long reign is Africanus' epitome of Manetho's Aegyptiaca, which credits Pepi I with a reign of 53 years.

Archaeological evidence in favor of a long reign for Pepi I includes his numerous building projects and many surviving objects made in celebration of his first Sed festival, which was meant to rejuvenate the king and was first celebrated on the 30th year of a king's rule. For example, numerous alabaster ointment vessels celebrating Pepi's first Sed festival have been discovered. They bear a standard inscriptions reading, "The king of Upper and Lower Egypt Meryre, may he be given life for ever. The first occasion of the Sed festival." Examples can now be found in museums throughout the world:

The Sed festival had a considerable importance for Old Kingdom kings. Representations of it were part of the typical decoration of temples associated with the ruler during the Old Kingdom, whether the king had actually celebrated it or not. As further evidence of the importance of this event in Pepi's case, the state administration seems to have had a tendency to mention his first jubilee repeatedly in the years following its celebration until the end of his rule in connection with building activities. For example, Pepi's final 25th cattle count reported on the Sixth Dynasty royal annals is associated with his first Sed festival even though it probably had taken place some 19 years prior.

Politics

Ascending the throne 

Pepi's accession to the throne may have occurred in times of discord. Manetho, writing nearly 2000 years after Pepi's reign, claims that Pepi's father Teti was assassinated by his own bodyguards. The Egyptologist Naguib Kanawati has argued in support of Manetho's claim, noting for example that Teti's reign saw a significant increase in the number of guards at the Egyptian court, who became responsible for the everyday care of the king. At the same time, the figures and names of several contemporary palace officials as represented in their tombs have been erased purposefully. This seems to be an attempt at a damnatio memoriae targeting three men in particular: the vizier Hezi, the overseer of weapons Mereri and chief physician Seankhuiptah. These men could therefore be behind the regicide.

Pepi may have been too young to be king. In any case, he did not immediately succeed his father. King Userkare succeeded him instead, but Userkare's identity and relationship to the royal family remain uncertain. It is possible Userkare served only as a regent with Pepi's mother Iput as Pepi reached adulthood, occupying the throne in the interregnum until Pepi's coming of age. The apparent lack of resistance to Pepi's eventual accession supports such hypotheses.

Against this view, however, Kanawati has argued that Userkare's short reign—lasting perhaps only one year—cannot be a regency as a regent would not have assumed a full royal titulary as Userkare did, nor would he be included in king lists. Rather, Userkare could have been an usurper and a descendant of a lateral branch of the Fifth Dynasty royal family who seized power briefly in a coup, possibly with the support of the priesthood of the sun god Ra. This hypothesis finds indirect evidence in Userkare's theophoric name which incorporates the name of Ra, a naming fashion common during the preceding Fifth Dynasty that had fallen out of use since Unas's reign. Further archeological evidence of Userkare's illegitimacy in the eyes of his successor is the absence of any mention of him in the tombs and biographies of the many Egyptian officials who served under both Teti and Pepi I. For example, the viziers Inumin and Khentika, who served both Teti and Pepi I, are completely silent about Userkare and none of their activities during his time on the throne are reported in their tomb. The tomb of Mehi, a guard who lived under Teti, Userkare and Pepi, yielded an inscription showing that the name of Teti was first erased to be replaced by that of another king, whose name was itself erased and replaced again by that of Teti. Kanawati argues the intervening name was that of Userkare to whom Mehi may have transferred his allegiance. Mehi's attempt to switch back to Teti was seemingly unsuccessful, as there is evidence that work on his tomb stopped abruptly and that he was never buried there.

For the Egyptologist Miroslav Bárta (cs), further troubles might have arisen directly between Pepi and relatives of his father Teti. Bárta and Baud point to Pepi's apparent decision to dismantle the funerary complex of his paternal grandmother Sesheshet, as witnessed by blocks from this queen's complex which were found reused as construction material in Pepi's own mortuary temple. On the other hand, Wilfried Seipel disagrees with this interpretation of the blocks being reused by Pepi, instead, he thinks the blocks bear witness to Pepi's foundation of a pious memorial to his grandmother. At the same time as he apparently distanced himself from his father's line, Pepi transformed his mother's tomb into a pyramid and posthumously bestowed a new title on her, "Daughter of the King of Upper and Lower Egypt", thereby emphasising his royal lineage as a descendant of Unas, last ruler of the Fifth Dynasty.

Pepi chose the Horus name of Mery-tawy, meaning "He who is loved by the two lands" or "Beloved of the Two Lands", which Nicolas Grimal sees as a clear indication that he desired political appeasement in times of troubles. Similarly, Pepi chose the throne name Nefersahor, meaning "Perfect is the protection of Horus". Bárta adds that Pepi's writing of his own name "Mery-tawy" is also highly unusual: he chose to invert the order of the hieroglyphic signs composing it, placing the sign for "Beloved" before that for "Two Lands". For Bárta and Yannis Gourdon, this deliberate choice shows Pepi's deference to the powerful nobility of the country, on which he was dependent. Although there seems to be no direct relation between Userkare's brief reign and one or more later conspiracies against him, this evidence suggests some form of political instability at the time.

Provincial administration 
In a long trend that began earlier in the Fifth Dynasty, the Old Kingdom Egyptian state was the subject of increasing decentralisation and regionalisation. Provincial families played an increasingly important role, marrying into the royal family, accessing the highest offices of the state administration and having a strong influence at the court, while also consolidating their hold over regional power bases by creating local dynasties.
These processes, well under way during Pepi I's reign, progressively weakened the king's primacy and ascendancy over his own administration and would ultimately result in the princedoms of the First Intermediate Period. Teti and Pepi I seem to have developed several policies to counteract this. They both changed the organisation of the territorial administration during their reigns: many provincial governors were nominated, especially in Upper Egypt, while Lower Egypt was possibly under direct royal administration.  
In addition, Pepi instigated the construction of royal Ka-chapels throughout Egypt to strengthen the royal presence in the provinces. These expensive policies suggest Egypt was prosperous during Pepi's reign. Small provincial centres in areas historically associated with the crown became more important, suggesting that pharaohs of the Sixth Dynasty tried to diminish the power of regional dynasties by recruiting senior officials who did not belong to them and were loyal to the pharaoh. Some of these new officials have no known background, indicating they were not of noble extraction. The circulation of high officials, who were moved from key positions of power to other duties, occurred at an "astonishing" pace under Teti and Pepi I according to the Egyptologist Juan Carlos Moreno García, in what might have been a deliberate attempt to curtail the concentration of power in the hands of a few officials.

The Sixth Dynasty royal annals, only a small part of which are still legible, record further activities during Pepi's reign, including the offering of milk and young cows for a feast of Ra, the building of a "south chapel" on the occasion of the new year and the arrival of messengers at court. Further offerings of lapis-lazuli, cattle, bread and beer are mentioned, for gods including Horus and the Ennead.

Conspiracy 

At some point in his reign, Pepi faced a conspiracy hatched by one of his harem consorts, only known by her title "Weret-Yamtes". Although Weni, who served as a judge during the subsequent trial, does not report the precise nature of her crime, this at least shows that the person of the king was not untouchable. If the conspiracy happened early in Pepi's reign as proposed by Wilfried Seipel and Vivienne Callender, the queen concerned could have been Userkare's mother and Teti's consort rather than Pepi's. Most scholars, however, agree with Hans Goedicke's thesis that the conspiracy occurred after more than two decades into Pepi's reign. For Goedicke, the queen could have been Merenre's mother. Nicolas Grimal and Baud see this as highly unlikely and outright outlandish respectively, as this queen's son would have been punished along with her. Rather, the queen might have attempted unsuccessfully to secure the throne for her son, whose name is now lost.

Perhaps in response to these events, Pepi changed his prenomen Nefersahor to Meryre, meaning "Beloved of Ra", even updating the inscriptions inside his pyramid. This late change with Pepi incorporating the sun god Ra's name into his own may reflect some agreement with the influential priesthood of Ra. Around this time, Pepi married two daughters of Khui, the provincial governor of Abydos. This may also have served to counteract the weakening of the king's authority over Middle and Upper Egypt by securing the allegiance of a powerful family. For Baud and Christopher Eyre, this also demonstrates that at the time of the Sixth Dynasty, government and power was still largely determined by family relationships rather than by bureaucracy.

The political importance of these marriages is furthered by the fact that for the first and last time until the 26th Dynasty some 1800 years later, a woman, Khui's wife Nebet, bore the title of vizier of Upper Egypt. Egyptologists debate whether this title was purely honorific or whether she really assumed the duties of a vizier. Later, Khui's and Nebet's son Djau was made vizier as well. Pepi's marriages might be at the origin of a trend which continued during the later Sixth and Eighth Dynasties, in which the temple of Min in Coptos—Khui's seat of power—was the focus of much royal patronage. The Coptos Decrees, which record successive pharaohs granting tax exemptions to the temple, as well as official honours bestowed by the kings on the local ruling family while the Old Kingdom society was collapsing, manifest this.

End of reign: coregency 
The end of Pepi's rule may have been no less troubled than his early reign, as Kanawati conjectures that Pepi faced yet another conspiracy against him, in which his vizier Rawer may have been involved. To support his theory, Kanawati observes that Rawer's image in his tomb has been desecrated, with his name, hands and feet chiselled off, while this same tomb is dated to the second half of Pepi's reign on stylistic grounds. Kanawati further posits that the conspiracy may have aimed at having someone else designated heir to the throne at the expense of Merenre. Because of this failed conspiracy, Pepi I may have taken the drastic step of crowning Merenre during his own reign, thereby creating the earliest documented coregency in the history of Egypt. That such a coregency took place was first proposed by Étienne Drioton. A gold pendant bearing the names of both Pepi I and Merenre I as living kings, and the copper statues of Hierakonpolis, discussed below,  indirectly support this.  Goedicke has suggested further that an inscription mentioning King Merenre's tenth year of reign in Hatnub, contradicting Manetho's figure of seven years, is evidence that Merenre dated the start of his reign before the end of his father's reign, as a coregency would permit.

The coregency remains uncertain. The Sixth Dynasty Royal annals bear no trace either for or against it, but the shape and size of the stone on which the annals are inscribed makes it more probable that Merenre did not start to count his years of reign until soon after the death of his father. Furthermore, William J. Murnane writes that the gold pendant's context is unknown, making its significance regarding the coregency difficult to appraise. The copper statues are similarly inconclusive as the identity of the smaller one, and whether they originally formed a group, remains uncertain.

Military campaigns 

Militarily, aggressive expansion into Nubia marked Pepi I's reign. The walls of the tombs of the contemporary nomarchs of Elephantine, alabaster vessels bearing Pepi's cartouche found in Kerma and inscriptions in Tumas report this. The Sixth Dynasty royal annals also recount at least one campaign into Nubia. Although the campaign narrative is now largely illegible, according to the Egyptologists Baud and Dobrev, it comprised three phases: first, messengers were sent to Nubia for negotiation and surveillance purposes; then the military campaign took place and finally a booty of men and goods was brought back to Egypt for presentation to the pharaoh.

To the north-east of Egypt, Pepi launched at least five military expeditions against the "sand dwellers" of Sinai and southern Canaan. These campaigns are recounted on the walls of the tomb of Weni, then officially a palace superintendent but given tasks befitting a general. Weni states that he ordered nomarchs in Upper Egypt and the Nile Delta region to "call up the levies of their own subordinates, and these in turn summoned their subordinates down through every level of the local administration". Meanwhile, Nubian mercenaries were also recruited and endowed with the power to enroll men and seize goods, so that in total tens of thousands of men were at Weni's disposal. This is the only text relating the raising of an Egyptian army during the Old Kingdom, and it indirectly reveals the absence of a permanent, standing army at the time. The goal of this army was either to repulse rebelling Semitic people or to seize their properties and conquer their land in southern Canaan, an action possibly motivated by the intense commercial activities between Egypt and this region. 
The Egyptians campaigned up to what was probably Mount Carmel or Ras Kouroun, landing troops on the coast using transport boats. Weni reports that walled towns were destroyed, fig trees and grape vines were cut down, and local shrines were burned.

Economy

The reign of Pepi I marks the apogee of the Sixth Dynasty foreign policy, with flourishing trade, several mining and quarrying expeditions and major military campaigns.

Foreign trade and mining
Trade with settlements along the Levantine coast, which had existed during the Fifth Dynasty, seems to have peaked under Pepi I and Pepi II. Their chief trade partner there might have been Byblos, where dozens of inscriptions on stone vessels showing Pepi's cartouches have been found, and a large alabaster vessel bearing Pepi's titulary and commemorating his jubilee from the Temple of Baalat Gebal. The high official, Iny, served Pepi during several successful expeditions to Byblos for which the king rewarded him with the name "Inydjefaw", meaning, "He who brings back provisions". Through Byblos, Egypt, had indirect contacts with the city of Ebla in modern-day Syria. The contact with Ebla is established by alabaster vessels bearing Pepi's name found near its royal palace G, destroyed in the 23rd century BC, possibly by the Akkadian Empire under Sargon. Trading parties departed Egypt for the Levant from a Nile Delta port called Ra-Hat, "the first mouth [of the Nile]". This trade benefited the nearby city of Mendes, from which one of Pepi's viziers probably originated. Further contacts with Canaan may be inferred from a statue of Pepi, which is said to have been unearthed in Gezer but has since been lost.

Expeditions and mining activities that were already taking place in the Fifth and early Sixth Dynasty continued unabated. These include at least one expedition of workmen and their military escort to the mines of turquoise and copper in Wadi Maghareh, Sinai,  around Pepi's 36th year on the throne. In all likelihood, this expedition departed Egypt from the Red Sea coast port of Ayn Soukhna, which was active during Pepi's reign. The same port may also have been the origin of an expedition to the southern Red Sea, possibly to Punt, as witnessed by Ethiopian obsidian discovered on the site. There were also one or more expeditions to Hatnub, where alabaster was extracted at least once in Pepi's 49th year of reign, as well as visits to the Gebel el-Silsila and Sehel Island. A trading expedition fetching lapis-lazuli and lead or tin may also have passed further south through Mirgissa. Greywacke and siltstone for building projects originated from quarries of the Wadi Hammamat, where some eighty graffiti mention Pepi I. At the same time, an extensive network of caravan routes traversed Egypt's Western Desert, for example, from Abydos to the Kharga Oasis and from there to the Dakhla and Selima Oases.

Domestic policies
Agricultural estates affiliated with the crown in the provinces during the preceding dynasty were replaced by novel administrative entities, the ḥwt, which were agricultural centres controlling tracts of land, livestock and workers. Together with temples and royal domains, these numerous ḥwt represented a network of warehouses accessible to royal envoys and from which taxes and labor could easily be collected.  This territorial mode of organisation disappeared nearly 300 years after Pepi I's reign, at the dawn of the Middle Kingdom period.

Pepi decreed tax-exemptions to various institutions. He gave an exemption to a chapel dedicated to the cult of his mother located in Coptos. Another decree has survived on a stele discovered near the Bent Pyramid in Dashur, whereby in his 21st year of reign, Pepi grants exemptions to the people serving in the two pyramids towns of Sneferu:

The Egyptologist David Warburton sees such perpetual tax exemptions as capitulations by a king confronted with rampant corruption. Whether they were the result of religious or political motives, exemptions created precedents that encouraged other institutions to request similar treatment, weakening the power of the state as they accumulated over time.

Further domestic activities related to agriculture and the economy may be inferred from the inscriptions found in the tomb of Nekhebu, a high official belonging to the family of Senedjemib Inti, a vizier during the late Fifth Dynasty. Nekhebu reports overseeing the excavations of canals in Lower Egypt and at Cusae in Middle Egypt.

Building activities

Pepi I built extensively throughout Egypt, so much so that in 1900 the Egyptologist Flinders Petrie stated "this king has left more monuments, large and small, than any other ruler before the Twelfth Dynasty". The Egyptologist Jean Leclant reached a similar conclusion in 1999. He sees Pepi's rule as marking the apogee of the Old Kingdom owing to the flurry of building activities, administrative reforms, trade and military campaigns at the time. Pepi devoted most of his building efforts to local cults and royal Ka-chapels, seemingly with the objective of affirming the king's stature and presence in the provinces.

Ka-chapels
Ka-chapels were small cult buildings comprising one or more chambers to hold offerings dedicated to the cult of the Ka of a deceased or, in this case, the king. Such chapels dedicated to Pepi I were uncovered or are known from contemporary sources to have stood in Hierakonpolis, in Abydos, and in the central Nile Delta region, in Memphis, Zawyet el-Meytin, Assiut, Qus and beyond the Nile Valley in Balat, a settlement of the Dakhla Oasis. In addition, two chapels were built in Bubastis and probably more than one stood in Dendera. Finally, yet another chapel is believed to have existed in Elkab, where rock inscriptions refer to his funerary cult. All these buildings were probably peripheral to or inside larger temples hosting extensive cult activities. For example, the chapel at Abydos was next to the temple of Khenti-Amentiu. For the Egyptologist Juan Moreno García, this proximity demonstrates the direct power that the king still held over the temples' economic activities and internal affairs during the Sixth Dynasty.

In an underground store beneath the floor of Hierakonpolis' Ka-chapel of Pepi, the Egyptologist James Quibell uncovered a statue of King Khasekhemwy of the Second Dynasty, a terracotta lion cub made during the Thinite era, a golden mask representing Horus and two copper statues. Originally fashioned by hammering plates of copper over a wooden base, these statues had been disassembled, placed inside one another and then sealed with a thin layer of engraved copper bearing the titles and names of Pepi I "on the first day of the Heb Sed" feast. The two statues were symbolically "trampling underfoot the Nine bows"—the enemies of Egypt—a stylized representation of Egypt's conquered foreign subjects. While the identity of the larger adult figure as Pepi I is revealed by the inscription, the identity of the smaller statue showing a younger person remains unresolved. The most common hypothesis among Egyptologists is that the young man shown is Merenre. As Alessandro Bongioanni and Maria Croce write: "[Merenre] was publicly associated as his father's successor on the occasion of the Jubilee [the Heb Sed feast]. The placement of his copper effigy inside that of his father would therefore reflect the continuity of the royal succession and the passage of the royal sceptre from father to son before the death of the pharaoh could cause a dynastic split." Alternatively, Bongioanni and Croce have also proposed the smaller statue may represent "a more youthful Pepy I, reinvigorated by the celebration of the Jubilee ceremonies".

Temples
The close association between Ka-chapels and temples to deities might have spurred building activities for the latter. For example, the Bubastis ensemble of Pepi I comprised a  enclosure wall with a small rectangular Ka-chapel housing eight pillars near its north corner. This ensemble was peripheral to the main Old Kingdom temple dedicated to the goddess Bastet.
In Dendera, where a fragmentary statue of a seated Pepi I has been uncovered, Pepi restored the temple complex to the goddess Hathor. He seems particularly to have desired to be associated with her, using the epithet "son of Hathor of Dendera" on numerous vessels found throughout Egypt and abroad. In Abydos, he built a small rock cut chapel dedicated to the local god Khenti-Amentiu, where he is again referred to as "Pepi, son of Hathor of Dendera". Pepi also referred to himself as the son of Atum of Heliopolis, direct evidence for the strengthening of the Heliopolitan cults at the time.

At the southern border of Egypt, in Elephantine, several faience plaques bearing Pepi's cartouche have been uncovered in the temple of Satet. These may suggest royal interest in the local cult. An alabaster statue of an ape with its offspring bearing Pepi I's cartouche was uncovered in the same location, but it was probably a gift of the king to a high official who then dedicated it to Satet. In this temple, Pepi built a red granite naos,  destined either to house the goddess's statue, or a statue of Pepi I himself, which would mean the naos was yet another Ka-chapel. Pepi seems to have undertaken wider works in the temple, possibly reorganising its layout by adding walls and an altar. In this context, the faience tablets bearing his cartouche may be foundation offerings made at the start of the works, although this has been contested. For the Egyptologist David Warburton, the reigns of Pepi I and II mark the first period during which small stone temples dedicated to local deities were built in Egypt.

Pyramid complex

Pepi I had a pyramid complex built for himself in South Saqqara, which he named Men-nefer-Pepi variously translated as "Pepi's splendour is enduring", "The perfection of Pepi is established", "The beauty of Pepi endures",  or "The perfection of Pepi endures". The shortened name Mennefer for the pyramid complex progressively became the name of the nearby capital of Egypt—which had originally been called Ineb-hedj. In particular, the Egyptian Mennefer ultimately gave Memphis in Greek, a name which is still in use for this ancient city. Pepi I's mortuary complex is neighboured on its south-west corner by a necropolis built during his own reign and the reigns of Merenre and Pepi II. The necropolis housed the pyramids of Pepi I's consorts and their dedicated funerary temples.

Main pyramid

Pepi's main pyramid was constructed in the same fashion as royal pyramids since the reign of Djedkare Isesi some 80 years earlier: a core built six steps high from small roughly dressed blocks of limestone bound together using clay mortar encased with fine limestone blocks.

The substructure of the pyramid was accessed from the north chapel which has since disappeared. From the entrance, a descending corridor gives way to a vestibule leading into the horizontal passage. Halfway along the passage, three granite portcullises guard the chambers. As in preceding pyramids, the substructure contains three chambers: an antechamber on the pyramids vertical axis, a serdab with three recesses to its east, and a burial chamber containing the king's sarcophagus to the west. Extraordinarily, the pink granite canopic chest that is sunk into the floor at the foot of the sarcophagus has remained undisturbed. Discovered alongside it was a bundle of viscera presumed to belong to the pharaoh. The provenance of a mummy fragment and fine linen wrappings discovered in the burial chamber are unknown, but they are hypothesized to belong to Pepi I.

The walls of Pepi I's antechamber, burial chamber, and much of the corridor are covered with vertical columns of inscribed hieroglyphic text. The hieroglyphs are painted green with ground malachite and gum arabic, a colour symbolising renewal. His sarcophagus is also inscribed on its east side with the king's titles and names, as part of a larger set of spells that includes texts at the bottom of the north and south walls opposite the sarcophagus, and in a line running across the top of the north, west, and south walls of the chamber. The writing comprises 2,263 columns and lines of text from 651 spells, of which 82 are unique to Pepi's pyramid. This is the most extensive corpus of Pyramid Texts from the Old Kingdom. The tradition of inscribing texts inside the pyramid was begun by Unas at the end of the Fifth Dynasty, but originally discovered in Pepi I's pyramid in 1880. Their function, like that of all funerary literature, was to enable the reunion of the ruler's ba and Ka, leading to the transformation into an akh, and to secure eternal life among the gods in the sky.

Mortuary temple

Pepi's pyramid was part of a wider funerary complex comprising a small cult pyramid and mortuary temple surrounded by an enclosure wall. The purpose of the cult pyramid remains unclear. While it had a burial chamber, it was never used as such and must have been a purely symbolic structure. It may have hosted the pharaoh's Ka, or a miniature statue of the king, and could have been used for ritual performances centring around the burial and resurrection of the Ka spirit during the Sed festival. Excavations of the small cult pyramid yielded statue fragments, pieces of stelae and offering tables which indicate the continuation of Pepi's funerary cult into the Middle Kingdom.

A valley temple by the Nile and a causeway leading from this temple up to the pyramid on the desert plateau completed the overall construction. The high temple, next to the pyramid, was laid out according to a standard plan, making it nearly the same as the temples of Djedkare Isesi, Unas, and Teti. Storage rooms to the north and south flanked the hall. The inner temple contained a chapel with five statue niches, an offering hall and other core chambers. Either the mortuary temple or the causeway might have been lined with statues of kneeling bound captives representing Egypt's traditional enemies. Both the temple and the causeway are now heavily damaged due the activity of lime makers, who extracted and burned the construction stones to turn them into mortar and whitewash in later times. In particular, the original location of the statues remains uncertain as they had been displaced, ready to be thrown into a lime furnace.

Necropolis of Pepi I
Pepi's mortuary complex was the centre of a wider necropolis which comprised the tombs of the royal family and further afield those of the high officials of the state administration including a tomb for Weni. Pepi had pyramids built for his consorts to the south and south-west of his pyramid. These were all located outside the complex' enclosure wall but inside an area delimited by a street to the west. The Ancient Egyptians referred to the owners of these pyramids as the "Queen of the East", "Queen of the Centre" and "Queen of the West".

Pyramid of Nebwenet
The pyramid of the queen of the east belonged to Nebwenet, whose name, image and titles are preserved on a fallen jamb uncovered in the attached mortuary temple. On its northern face was a small mudbrick chapel, which hosted a limestone altar, now broken. The pyramid's substructures were accessed from a descending passageway leading first to an antechamber and, from there, to the burial chamber slightly to the south of the pyramid's apex. This chamber yielded fragments of pink granite sarcophagus and pieces of inscribed alabaster. To the east was a serdab and the scant remnants of funerary equipment.

Pyramid of Inenek-Inti
Immediately west of the pyramid of the queen of the east was the pyramid of the queen of the centre, Inenek-Inti. Fragments of a greywacke sarcophagus and pieces of stone vessels were uncovered there. Unlike Ankhesenpepi II's burial chamber, that of Inenek-Inti had no inscriptions on its walls. Inenek's mortuary temple was much larger than Nebwenet's, surrounding her pyramid on its eastern, northern and southern sides. Inenek's complex also comprised a small cult pyramid,  at the base, on the south-east corner of the mortuary temple.

Queen of the West
West of Inenek's pyramid is that of the queen of the west. The identity of this pyramid's owner is preserved on an obelisk in front of her pyramid only as "the eldest daughter of the king". Entry into the substructure is gained on the north face. The burial chamber is located under the vertical axis of the pyramid. The location of the serdab is unusual, being to the south of the burial chamber instead of east. Substantial remains of funerary equipment were found inside including wooden weights, ostrich feathers, copper fish hooks, and fired-clay vessels, but none bore their owner's name. It has a hastily built mortuary temple, with an offering hall and a room with two statue niches. Relief fragments discovered depict scenes of processions and estates, along with an incomplete cartouche of Pepi I's name.

Pyramid of Ankhesenpepi II

It comprised a  mortuary temple to the north of the pyramid and 20 storage rooms for offerings.
A small chapel stood on the pyramid northern face, at the entrance of the substructures. Painted reliefs of which only scant remains have been found including a small scene depicting the queen and a princess on a boat among papyrus plants, adorned the accompanying funerary temple. The burial chamber walls were inscribed with spells from the pyramid texts, a privilege that had been the preserve of kings. Fragments from a black basalt sarcophagus were uncovered onsite.

Pyramid of Behenu
Located on the western end of the necropolis, immediately north-west of Mehaa's tomb on which it intrudes, Behenu's mortuary temple was on the pyramid's southern face with a cult pyramid on its south-east corner. The entrance of the temple, flanked with two granite obelisks, led to several rooms, which once housed statues and offering altars, while a further 10 rooms served for storage.
The burial chamber measured , and its walls were inscribed with numerous spells of the pyramid texts. The head of a wooden statue of the queen as well as her opened basalt sarcophagus were unearthed there.

Pyramid of Mehaa
Pepi's consort Mehaa was buried in a pyramid on the south-west corner of Pepi's enclosure wall. Directly adjacent to Mehaa's pyramid's eastern face was her mortuary temple, where a relief bearing the name and image of Prince Hornetjerykhet, her son, was uncovered. Mehaa's pyramid is intruded upon by the pyramid of Behenu, establishing that Mehaa was a consort of Pepi I early in his reign while Behenu lived in the later part of his rule.

Other attestations
At Hierakonpolis, two statues of Pepi I were found in 1897. They are the oldest life-sized metal statues known. One is 178 cm high and the other is 78 cm high. Both are made of copper sheets connected by rivets.

Legacy

Old Kingdom
Pepi I was the object of a funerary cult after his death. For the remainder of the Old Kingdom period, the funerary cult of Pepi had active priests even outside of his Saqqara mortuary complex, for example inscriptions in Elkab attest to the presence of priests of his cult officiating in or in the vicinity of the local temple of Nekhbet. The ritual activities taking place in his main funerary complex continued up until the Middle Kingdom. This means that Pepi's cult continued to be celebrated during the First Intermediate Period, a period during which the Egyptian state seems to have collapsed, with only brief interruptions of the cultic activities at times of important political instability. 

As members of the royal family and high officials had continued to be buried in the necropolis next to Pepi's pyramid during the reigns of Merenre and Pepi II, including Ankhesenpepi II and III and Pepi's daughter Meritites, Pepi's necropolis had grown and had attracted burials from the highest officials such as vizier Weni. Starting with the reign of Pepi II, the necropolis also attracted burials from private individuals as well as popular devotion to him and his consorts. The deposit of numerous offering tables throughout the site confirms this.

Middle Kingdom
The conquest of Egypt under Mentuhotep II seems to have interrupted all activities in the necropolis. These resumed towards the end of the Eleventh Dynasty, when the state-sponsored funerary cult of Pepi was renewed, albeit in a more limited form than earlier. At this time, private cultic activities seem to cease in the wider necropolis of Pepi, rather concentrating in Pepi's own mortuary temple, mainly around his statues, then accessible to important officials participating in the pharaoh's cult. Meanwhile, the abandonment of certain parts of the mortuary temple and the queens' necropolis led to the installation of novel tombs. The most prominent of these was that of the high official Reheryshefnakht, who had a small pyramid complex built for himself in the midst of the tombs of the Sixth Dynasty royal family. The royal cult of Pepi I seems to have ended with the onset of the Second Intermediate Period.

New Kingdom

The New Kingdom period witnessed renewed private burials in the necropolis of Pepi, including in several rooms of his mortuary temple which were used as a catacomb at the time, although no such tomb was found in the main room hosting the royal funerary cult, suggesting continued use. The individuals buried in the necropolis belonged to the lower ranks of Egyptian society, as shown by the simplicity, if not the absence, of funerary equipment, while those using the catacombs were richer. 
  
The consequences of the long-lasting cults of Old Kingdom pharaohs during the New Kingdom are apparent in the Karnak king list. It was composed during the reign of Thutmosis III to honour a selection of royal ancestors.  Several pharaohs of the Fifth and Sixth Dynasty including Nyuserre Ini, Djedkare Isesi, Teti and Pepi I are mentioned on the list by their birth name, rather than throne name. The Egyptologist Antonio Morales believes this is because the popular cults for these kings, which existed well into the New Kingdom, referred to these kings using their birth name.

Later, during the reign of Ramses II, limited restoration works on the Old Kingdom monuments took place in the Memphite area under the direction of Prince Khaemweset. Pepi's pyramid complex was among those restored, as shown by inscriptions left on-site by Khaemweset, even though it was actively being used for private burials. Pepi I's necropolis was, therefore, probably in a ruined state at this point, with the area with the queens' pyramids serving as a stone quarry. Khaemweset stated he had found the pyramid "abandoned" and "recalled his proprietor for posterity". The progressive accumulation of burials in the passages leading up to the temple cult rooms blocked all access to it, demonstrating that Pepi's funerary cult had ceased.

Late Period
The stone quarrying activities, which were limited to Pepi's necropolis during the New Kingdom and had spared his mortuary temple, became widespread during the Late Period of Egypt, with intermittent burials continuing nonetheless. Both the stone robbing and funerary activities stopped at some point during the period, and the necropolis was abandoned until the Mamluk period when intense stone quarrying resumed.

Notes

References

Bibliography 

 

 
 

 

 

 
 

 

 

 
 

 

 

 

 
 

 

 

 
 
 

 
 

 
24th-century BC births
23rd-century BC deaths
Year of birth unknown
24th-century BC Pharaohs
23rd-century BC Pharaohs
Pharaohs of the Sixth Dynasty of Egypt